A melee ( or , French: mêlée ) or pell-mell is disorganized hand-to-hand combat in battles fought at abnormally close range with little central control once it starts. In military aviation, a melee has been defined as "[a]n air battle in which several aircraft, both friend and foe, are confusingly intermingled".

History of the term
In the 1579 translation of Plutarch's Lives of the noble Grecians and Romanes, Sir Thomas North uses the term '' to refer to a disorganized retreat. The phrase was later used in its current spelling in Shakespeare's Richard III, 1594:

The phrase comes from the French expression pêle-mêle, a rhyme based on the old French mesler, meaning to mix or mingle.

The French term melee was first used in English in c. 1640 (also derived from the old French mesler,  but the Old French stem survives in medley and meddle).

Lord Nelson described his tactics for the Battle of Trafalgar as inducing a "pell mell battle" focused on engagements between individual ships where the superior morale and skill of the Royal Navy would prevail.

The destroyer night action of the second Naval Battle of Guadalcanal on 13 November 1942 was so chaotic, and the opposing ships so intermingled, that an officer on  later likened it to "a barroom brawl after the lights had been shot out".

Usage in sport

In Australian Rules Football, the term "melee" is used by the Australian Football League, sports commentators and journalists as a polite term for a brawl or fighting during a football match, where football players physically attack. Melees often start as verbal disagreements between a small number players from the opposing teams, but can quickly escalate into many players from both teams joining in with this physical scuffle.

See also

Chance medley
Close-quarters combat
Combat
Galley tactics
Melee (gaming)
Melee weapon

Notes

References

Military science